The following squads were named for the 1960 Summer Olympics tournament.

Group A

Bulgaria
Head coach: Stoyan Ormandjiev

Turkey
Head coach: Şeref Görkey

United Arab Republic
Head coach:  Pál Titkos

Yugoslavia
Head coach: Aleksandar Tirnanić

Group B

Brazil
Head coach: Vicente Feola

Formosa
Head coach:  Lee Wai Tong

Great Britain

Head coach:  Norman Creek

Italy
Head coach: Giuseppe Viani

Group C

Argentina
Head coach: Ernesto Duchini

Denmark
Head coach: Arne Sørensen

Poland
Head coaches: Czesław Krug; trainers  Jean Prouff and  Ryszard Koncewicz

Tunisia

Head coach:  Milan Kristić

Group D

France
Head coach: Jean Rigal

Hungary
Head coach: Béla Volentik

India
Head coach: Syed Abdul Rahim

Peru
Head coach:  György Orth

References

External links
 FIFA
 RSSSF
 Argentina squad at AFA
 Denmark squad at DBU 
 Lingua Sport

1960 Summer Olympics
Football at the 1960 Summer Olympics